John Hannay Thompson FRSE MICE (1869–c.1940) was a British civil engineer and technical author. He specialised in harbour works and made studies on the unintentional interaction of ships in the water.

Life
He was born in Newcastle-upon-Tyne the son of John Thompson, also a civil engineer. He was educated at Trinity College, Harrogate then studied engineering at Durham University and at the Armstrong College in Newcastle.

His working career began around 1890, his first project being the graving dock for Wallsend Slipway Company. He then worked on the new graving docks at both South Shields and Blyth, before venturing to Europe to work on the graving dock at Bilbao. He then obtained the highly prestigious position as Engineer-in-Charge of the No1 Admiralty Harbour Works at Dover, Britain's premier port. From this role he was appointed General Manager and Chief Engineer of Dundee Harbour Trust.

In 1907 he was elected a Fellow of the Royal Society of Edinburgh. His proposers were Johannes Kuenen, Sir D'Arcy Wentworth Thompson, Angus McGillivray and Sir James Walker. He resigned from the Society in 1915.

In the First World War he was a Captain in the Volunteer Brigade of the Black Watch.

He lived his later live at "Sorbie" a large villa in Broughty Ferry.

Publications
Suction or Interaction Between Passing Vessels
Dundee Harbour Trust Centenary (1930)
Dundee Harbour Trust (1933)
Granton Harbour (1934)
Granton Harbour Centenary (1937)

Family
His son, John Horace Hannay-Thompson, was also a civil engineer, graduating from St Andrews University in 1924.

References

1869 births
People from Newcastle upon Tyne
British civil engineers
Fellows of the Royal Society of Edinburgh
1940s deaths
Alumni of Armstrong College, Durham
British Army personnel of World War I
Black Watch officers